In Evening Air is the second album by American synth-pop band Future Islands, released on May 4, 2010 by Thrill Jockey records. It is titled after a poem of the same name by Theodore Roethke from his final collection, The Far Field. The album art was produced by former band member Kymia Nawabi.

In Evening Air was heavily influenced by Orchestral Manoeuvres in the Dark's 1983 album, Dazzle Ships.

Track listing

Reception

The album received mostly positive reviews with Pitchfork giving it 7.6/10.  The aggregated score from 11 critics on Metacritic is a rating of 74/100.

Trivia
The songs Inch of Dust and Vireo's Eye were used for the TV series Shameless.

References

External links
Allmusic profile

2010 albums
Future Islands albums